Grønning Church or Ytre Eidsfjord Church is a parish church of the Church of Norway in Hadsel Municipality in Nordland county, Norway. It is located in the tiny village of Grønning along the Eidsfjorden on the island of Langøya. It is the church for the Ytre Eidsfjord parish which is part of the Vesterålen prosti (deanery) in the Diocese of Sør-Hålogaland. The white, wooden church was built in a long church style in 1968 using plans drawn up by the architect Ola Stavseth. The church seats about 220 people.

History
The first church built on this site was completed in 1882 using designs by the architect J.H. Nissen. That church burned down in 1935, but it was not rebuilt. The present building was constructed in 1968 out of the materials from an old school.

Media gallery

See also
List of churches in Sør-Hålogaland

References

Hadsel
Churches in Nordland
Wooden churches in Norway
20th-century Church of Norway church buildings
Churches completed in 1968
1882 establishments in Norway
Long churches in Norway